China competed at the 2004 Summer Olympics in Athens, Greece, from 13 to 29 August 2004. This was the nation's ninth appearance at the Summer Olympics since its debut in 1952. A total of 384 Chinese athletes, 136 men and 248 women, were selected by the Chinese Olympic Committee to compete in 28 sports. For the third time in its Olympic history, China was represented by more female than male athletes.

China left Athens with a total of 63 Olympic medals – 32 golds, 17 silver, and 14 bronze – finishing third in the overall medal standings and second only to the United States in the gold medal tally. The Chinese delegation proved particularly successful in several sports, winning nine medals each in diving and shooting, eight in weightlifting, six in table tennis, and five each in badminton and judo. Chinese athletes dominated in badminton, diving, and table tennis, where they each won gold medals in most sporting events. Three Chinese athletes managed to defend their titles from the 2000 Summer Olympics in Sydney, while six of them won more than a single medal in Athens. China's team-based athletes came strong and successful in Athens, as the women's volleyball team managed to strike the Russians for the gold medal.

Among the nation's medalists were hurdler Liu Xiang, who emerged as China's first male athlete to win an Olympic gold medal in men's track and field, badminton player Zhang Ning in the women's singles, diving tandem Wu Minxia and Guo Jingjing in the women's synchronized platform, and tennis players Li Ting and Sun Tiantian, who became the first Asians to capture an Olympic title in the women's doubles. Badminton player Gao Ling, who won a gold and a silver in both the mixed doubles with Zhang Jun and the women's doubles with Huang Sui, became the most decorated Chinese athlete in the sporting history with a total of four Olympic medals. Along with Zhang Jun and Gao Ling for their Olympic defense campaign, taekwondo jin Chen Zhong successfully repeated her gold medal from Sydney in the women's heavyweight division.

With Beijing being the host city of the 2008 Summer Olympics, a traditional Chinese segment was performed during the closing ceremony.

Medalists

|  style="text-align:left; width:72%; vertical-align:top;"|

| style="text-align:left; width:23%; vertical-align:top;"|

Archery

Five Chinese archers (two men and three women) qualified each for the men's and women's individual archery, and a spot for the women's team.

Men

Women

Athletics

Chinese athletes have so far achieved qualifying standards in the following athletics events (up to a maximum of 3 athletes in each event at the 'A' Standard, and 1 at the 'B' Standard).

Men
Track & road events

Field events

Combined events – Decathlon

Women
Track & road events

Field events

Combined events – Heptathlon

Badminton

Men

Women

Mixed

Basketball

Men's tournament

Roster

Group play

Quarterfinals

Classification match (7th–8th place)

Women's tournament

Roster

Group play

Classification match (9th–10th place)

Boxing

People's Republic of China sent six boxers to Athens. They won one bronze medal, with one other quarterfinalist. Their combined record was 6-6 as three boxers lost their first matches. They were in a five-way tie for 16th place in the medals board for boxing.

Canoeing

Slalom

Sprint
Men

Women

Qualification Legend: Q = Qualify to final; q = Qualify to semifinal

Cycling

Road

Track
Time trial

Omnium

Mountain biking

Diving

Chinese divers qualified for eight individual spots at the 2004 Olympic Games. Four Chinese synchronized diving teams qualified through the 2004 FINA Diving World Cup.

Men

Women

Fencing

Men

Women

Field hockey

Women's tournament

Roster

Group play

Semifinals

Bronze Medal match

Football

Women's tournament

Roster

Group play

Gymnastics

Artistic
Men
Team

Individual finals

Women
Team

Individual finals

Rhythmic

Trampoline

Handball

Women's tournament

Roster

Group play

Quarterfinal

5th-8th Place Classification

7th-8th Place Final

Judo

Nine Chinese judoka (two men and seven women) qualified for the 2004 Summer Olympics.

Men

Women

Modern pentathlon

Three Chinese athletes qualified to compete in the modern pentathlon event through the Asian Championships.

Rowing

Chinese rowers qualified the following boats:

Men

Women

Qualification Legend: FA=Final A (medal); FB=Final B (non-medal); FC=Final C (non-medal); FD=Final D (non-medal); FE=Final E (non-medal); FF=Final F (non-medal); SA/B=Semifinals A/B; SC/D=Semifinals C/D; SE/F=Semifinals E/F; R=Repechage

Sailing

Chinese sailors have qualified one boat for each of the following events.

Men

Women

Open

M = Medal race; OCS = On course side of the starting line; DSQ = Disqualified; DNF = Did not finish; DNS= Did not start; RDG = Redress given

Shooting 

Twenty-six Chinese shooters (fifteen men and eleven women) qualified to compete in the following events:

Men

Women

* = Won in shoot-off

Softball 

In the final game of the preliminary round, China was the victim of the first perfect game in Olympic softball history, losing to Japan 2–0. Their defeat two days later in the semifinal, again to Japan, eliminated China from medal contention.

Preliminary Round

Quarterfinal

Swimming

Chinese swimmers earned qualifying standards in the following events (up to a maximum of 2 swimmers in each event at the A-standard time, and 1 at the B-standard time):

Men

Women

*Competed only in heats and received medals

Synchronized swimming 

Nine Chinese synchronized swimmers qualified a spot in the women's team.

Table tennis

Nine Chinese table tennis players qualified for the following events.

Men

Women

Taekwondo

Two Chinese taekwondo jin qualified for the following events.

Tennis

China won its first Olympic tennis medal, a gold, in the women's doubles. Following this victory, China became the only nation to claim gold medals in all three Olympic racquet sports (badminton, table tennis, tennis), and more importantly, to capture the gold medal in the women's doubles for all of these events.

Triathlon

Two Chinese triathletes qualified for the following events.

Volleyball

Beach

Indoor

Women's tournament

Roster

Group play

Quarterfinal

Semifinal

Gold Medal Final

 Won Gold Medal

Weightlifting 

Ten Chinese weightlifters qualified for the following events:

Men

Women

Wrestling 

Men's freestyle

Men's Greco-Roman

Women's freestyle

See also
 China at the 2002 Asian Games
 China at the 2004 Summer Paralympics

References

External links
Official Report of the XXVIII Olympiad
Chinese Olympic Committee  

Nations at the 2004 Summer Olympics
2004
Summer Olympics